Li Fang (1895—?) was a Chinese diplomat in the early Republic of China who later joined the pro-Japanese Reorganized National Government of China under Wang Jingwei, serving as its minister in Romania and Hungary. As a commercial attaché in Berlin in 1941, he briefly served as the Nanjing regime's interim ambassador to Germany before the arrival of Li Shengwu. A diplomatic capable described him as a close associate of Wang Jingwei, an anti-communist, and a "friend of Germany's."

References

1895 births
Chinese diplomats
Chinese collaborators with Imperial Japan
Kuomintang collaborators with Imperial Japan
Ambassadors of China to Germany
Year of death missing
Chinese anti-communists